The Bromford Viaduct carries the M6 motorway between Castle Bromwich (junction 5) and Gravelly Hill (junction 6 - Gravelly Hill Interchange) along the River Tame valley in Birmingham, England.
being  longer than the Second Severn Crossing. It was constructed during the period 1964–1972.

Between 2012 and 2014, the motorway along the length of the viaduct was converted to a smart motorway system, with variable speed limits.

References

Viaducts in England
Motorway bridges in England
Bridges in the West Midlands (county)
Buildings and structures in Birmingham, West Midlands
M6 motorway